Arc-et-Senans station is a railway station in the commune of Arc-et-Senans, in the French department of Doubs, in the Bourgogne-Franche-Comté region.

Services
The following services stop at Arc-et-Senans:

 TER Bourgogne-Franche-Comté:

References

External links 
 
 

Railway stations in Doubs